This article discusses the participation of the Netherlands at the 2018 European Athletics Championships. Netherlands was represented by 45 athletes at the 2018 European Athletics Championships in Berlin, Germany, 6–12 August 2018.

Medals

Results
The following athletes were selected to compete by the Royal Dutch Athletics Federation.

 Men 
 Track and road

Field events

Combined events – Decathlon

Women
 Track and road

Field events

Combined events – Heptathlon

References

Nations at the 2018 European Athletics Championships
Netherlands at the European Athletics Championships